Reyhan (also Romanized as Reyḩān and Rihān; also known as Rikhan) is a village in Mojezat Rural District, in the Central District of Zanjan County, Zanjan Province, Iran. At the 2006 census, its population was 167, in 40 families.

References 

Populated places in Zanjan County